The Heavy Metal Box is a CD box set with heavy metal / rock songs from various artists and bands. It was released by Rhino Records in 2007.

The box set begins with early heavy metal, to the NWOBHM and 1980s glam and thrash metal and ends with the extreme and alternative metal of the 2000s.

Track listing

Disc one 

 Blue Cheer – "Summertime Blues"
 Led Zeppelin – "Heartbreaker" 
 Uriah Heep – "Easy Livin'"
 Deep Purple – "Highway Star"
 Alice Cooper – "No More Mr. Nice Guy"
 Black Sabbath – "War Pigs"
 Montrose – "Bad Motor Scooter"
 Rush – "Working Man"
 Rainbow – "Man on the Silver Mountain"
 Kiss – "Strutter"
 Judas Priest – "The Ripper"
 Ted Nugent – "Cat Scratch Fever"
 UFO – "Lights Out"
 Blue Öyster Cult – "Godzilla"
 Girlschool – "Demolition Boys"
 Angel Witch – "White Witch"
 Iron Maiden – "The Phantom of the Opera"

Disc two 

 Motörhead – "Ace of Spades"
 Diamond Head – "Am I Evil?"
 Rose Tattoo – "Nice Boys"
 Michael Schenker Group – "Attack of the Mad Axeman"
 Saxon – "Denim and Leather"
 Blitzkrieg – "Blitzkrieg"
 Tygers of Pan Tang – "Gangland"
 Venom – "Witching Hour"
 Judas Priest – "You've Got Another Thing Comin'"
 Iron Maiden – "The Number of the Beast"
 Raven – "Star War"
 Fastway – "Say What You Will"
 Mercyful Fate – "Black Funeral"
 W.A.S.P. – "Animal (Fuck Like a Beast)"
 Y&T – "Mean Streak"
 Dio – "Holy Diver"
 Queensrÿche – "Queen of the Reich"
 Metallica – "For Whom The Bell Tolls"

Disc three 

 Scorpions – "Rock You Like a Hurricane"
 Quiet Riot – "Metal Health"
 Dokken – "Into the Fire"
 Accept – "Balls to the Wall"
 Ratt – "Round and Round"
 Twisted Sister – "I Wanna Rock"
 Hanoi Rocks – "The Boulevard Of Broken Dreams"
 Spinal Tap – "Big Bottom"
 Krokus – "Midnite Maniac"
 Yngwie Malmsteen – "I'll See the Light, Tonight"
 Loudness – "Crazy Nights"
 Cinderella – "Shake Me"
 Metal Church – "Watch the Children Pray"
 Stryper – "To Hell with the Devil"
 Helloween – "A Little Time"
 Overkill – "Wrecking Crew"
 Anthrax – "Caught in a Mosh"
 Megadeth – "Peace Sells"

Disc four 

 Whitesnake – "Still of the Night"
 Great White – "Rock Me"
 Faster Pussycat – "Bathroom Wall"
 Savatage – "Hall of the Mountain King"
 Lita Ford – "Kiss Me Deadly"
 Manowar – "Hail and Kill"
 Testament – "Trial By Fire"
 King Diamond – "Welcome Home"
 Slayer – "South of Heaven"
 Metallica – "One"
 Living Colour – "Cult of Personality"
 Skid Row – "Youth Gone Wild"
 Pantera – "Walk"
 Prong – "Beg To Differ"
 Sepultura – "Dead Embryonic Cells"
 Korn - "Blind"

References

2007 compilation albums
Heavy metal compilation albums
Rhino Records compilation albums